Peaky Blinders is a British period crime drama television series created by Steven Knight. Set in Birmingham, England, it follows the exploits of the Peaky Blinders crime gang in the direct aftermath of the First World War. The fictional gang is loosely based on a real urban youth gang of the same name who were active in the city from the 1910s. It premiered on 12 September 2013, telecast on BBC Two until the fourth series, then moved to BBC One for the fifth and sixth series.

On 18 January 2021, it was announced that the sixth series would be the final television series of Peaky Blinders.

Series overview

Episodes

Series 1 (2013)

Series 2 (2014)

Series 3 (2016)

Series 4 (2017)

Series 5 (2019)

Series 6 (2022)

Ratings

References

External links
  on BBC—The official website for the series in the United Kingdom.
  on Netflix—The official website for the series in the United States.
 —A user-generated database of information related to the series.

Peaky Blinders